Who's the Man? is a 1993 thriller buddy comedy film directed by Ted Demme in his feature film directing debut. The film stars Yo! MTV Raps hosts Doctor Dré and Ed Lover as its two main protagonists and features cameo appearances from some of the top rap/hip-hop acts of the time, including (though not limited to) Busta Rhymes, Bushwick Bill, Guru, Eric B., House of Pain, Ice-T, Kris Kross, Phife Dawg, Queen Latifah, KRS-One, Run-D.M.C., and a young Del the Funky Homosapien. The film is also the feature film debut of Terrence Howard.

Plot
Doctor Dré and Ed Lover are two bumbling barbers at a Harlem barbershop. Knowing full well that cutting hair is not their calling, their boss, friend, and mentor Nick (Jim Moody) tells the two maybe they should try out for the police academy. They refuse at first, but Nick threatens them with unemployment. Crazily enough, it works out for the two, and they are accepted on the New York City police force. Things seem to be going well for them, when tragedy suddenly strikes, and they lose Nick and the barbershop. Now enforcers of the law, the team decides to investigate the incident, which they believe to be a murder.

Ed and Dre find out through the streets that a crooked land developer named Demetrius (Richard Bright) might have had something to do with their friend's death, and proceed to attempt to dig up as much dirt on him as possible. This proves to be difficult, however, when they've got an angry Sergeant (Denis Leary), a moody detective (Rozwill Young), and a bunch of unwilling street hoods (Guru, Ice-T) to go through to get the information they need. Though there aren't any certain clues to be found, strange happenings are certainly going on, as the cops found out that Demetrius' company seems to be looking for oil rather than looking for property.

With their superiors not believing Ed and Dre's story and getting themselves in trouble, they end up being suspended. However, they get a lead to a warehouse where they find a lot of guns. They have enough evidence to arrest Demetrius, but Demetrius didn't kill Nick. It was revealed that Nick's friend, Lionel, who was working for Demetrius had murdered him because Nick refused to sell his shop. Ed and Dre have Lionel arrested.

Ed and Dre are offered their jobs back, but decided to quit, stating it's too violent for them. When they return to their old barbershop they discover oil coming from the floor. Soon after, they're back in business re-opening the place giving customers bad haircuts.

Cast
 Doctor Dré as himself
 Ed Lover as himself
 Badja Djola as Lionel Douglas
 Cheryl "Salt" James as Teesha Braxton
 Colin Quinn as Frankie Flynn
 Denis Leary as Sergeant Cooper
 Bernie Mac  as G-George
 Terrence Howard as Costumer 
 Richard Gant as Albert
 Guru as Martin Lorenzo
 Ice-T as Chauncey "Nighttrain" Jackson
 Larry Cedar as Officer Barnes
 Jim Moody as Nick Crawford
 Joe Lisi as Captain Reilly
 Karen Duffy as Officer Day
 Roger Robinson as Charlie
 Richard Bright as Demetrius
 Rozwill Young as Bo Griles
 Vinny Pastore as Tony "Clams" Como
 Tony Lip as Vito Pasquale
 Caron Bernstein as Kelly
 Kim Chan as Fuji

Cameo appearances
 B-Fine as Club Guy #1
 B-Real as Jose
 Apache as Bubba Worker #1
 Bill Bellamy as K.K.
 Big Bub as Roscoe
 Bow-Legged Lou as Forty
 Bushwick Bill as Bar Vagrant
 Busta Rhymes as Jawaan
Angelo Montagnese as The Manno
Michael Giordano as Not The Manno
 Chi-Ali as Drew
 CL Smooth as Robber #2
 Danny Boy as Steve
 Del the Funkee Homosapien as Kid #1
 D-Nice as Male Nurse
 DJ Lethal as Mike
 D.J. Wiz as Test Taker #1
 Dres as Malik
 Eric B. as Robber #5
 Everlast as Billy
 Fab 5 Freddy as himself
 Flavor Flav as himself
 Freddie Foxxx as Bartender
 Gavin O'Connor as Police Drill Man 
 Heavy D as himself
 House of Pain - Card players
 Humpty Hump as Club Doorman
 Kid Capri as himself
 King Sun as Haircut Guy
 Kris Kross as Karim/Micah
 KRS-One as Rashid
 Leaders of the New School as Passengers in Jeep
 Lin Que Ayoung as Female Nurse
 Mark Sexx as Guy at Bar
 Melle Mel as Delroy
 Monie Love as Vanessa
 Naughty By Nature as Themselves
 Nikki D as Protestor
 Pete Rock as Robber #1
 Penny Hardaway as Darryl
 Phife Dawg as Gerald
 Queen Latifah as herself
 Run-D.M.C. as Detectives
 Sandra "Pepa" Denton as Sherise
 Scottie Pippen as Raymond
 Showbiz & A.G. as Test Taker #2/Test Taker #3
 Smooth B as Bubba Worker #2
 Stretch as Benny
 Taji and Qu'ran Goodman as Kid #2/Kid #3
 Yo-Yo as Woman

Reception 
Rotten Tomatoes gives the film a score of 50% based on reviews from 7 critics.

Roger Ebert gives a favorable review, with a score of 3 stars out of 4.

Soundtrack

A soundtrack containing hip hop music was released on April 20, 1993, through MCA Records. It peaked at #32 on the Billboard 200 and #8 on the Top R&B/Hip-Hop Albums.

References

External links
 
 
 

1993 films
1990s police comedy films
African-American comedy films
De Passe Entertainment films
1993 directorial debut films
Films directed by Ted Demme
Films set in Brooklyn
1990s hip hop films
1990s English-language films
1990s American films